Samuel Calley (April 13, 1821 – January 1, 1883) was a Massachusetts house painter and politician who served as the eighteenth and twenty second Mayor of Salem, Massachusetts, and in the Massachusetts House of Representatives from 1870 to 1871.

Death 
Calley committed suicide by hanging himself from a step ladder.

References 
 

1821 births
1883 deaths
American politicians who committed suicide
Mayors of Salem, Massachusetts
Republican Party members of the Massachusetts House of Representatives
Suicides by hanging in Massachusetts
House painters
19th-century American politicians
1880s suicides